The Pangani barb (Labeobarbus oxyrhynchus) is a species of cyprinid fish.

It is found in Kenya and Tanzania. Its natural habitat is rivers. It is not considered a threatened species by the IUCN.

References

Labeobarbus
Cyprinid fish of Africa
Freshwater fish of Kenya
Freshwater fish of Tanzania
Taxa named by Georg Johann Pfeffer
Fish described in 1889
Taxonomy articles created by Polbot